Chauke (also known as Chau or Chaoke, Chouke) is a town of Malwa in the Bathinda district of Punjab state, India. It comes under the Maur Mandi assembly constituency. It shares its boundaries with Bathinda district, Punjab and Barnala districts of Punjab.

Location
Chauke is located approximately 15 kilometres from both Maur Mandi and Rampura Phul, and 7 kilometers from Mandi Kalan. Other cities central to Chauke are Tapa Mandi as well as Mansa. It is located approximately 8 kilometers from Mansa-Barnala main road.

Population
Chauke's population is approximately 12000 with voting population of 7386(according to voter list of January 2017), making it one of the Biggest village of the constituency Maur Mandi.

Education
Chauke has a Government Secondary School and two Primary School.  A number of private schools have come up in the recent times. Also students who study in various distant schools. It has got the proper transport facility for daily travel to the school. Chauke has an Adarsh school (aklia). Many Army Training Academics are here where boys from village as well as other villages prepare for army written exam. More than 300 boys are serving the nation from this village.education tree academy and dashmesh academy are famous institutes all over Punjab for army exams

Although Chauke village is a big village yet it has NO big college or University in it. There should be a branch college/campus of Agriculture university, Punjab university or Punjabi university. Such a college should cater education needs of surrounding villages. There are no evening classes in the schools situated in the village. There should be a world class sports complex in the village to channelise the energy of youth towards positive end. There is no big skill development centre or vocational training centre in the village. Stitching, AC repair, automobile and tractor repair, electrician, welding etc. courses should be taught in village and certificates should be provided to candidates. It will help students in India as well as in abroad.

In the end, it should be said that education sector is still not fully developed in the village. But the Chauke village has hugeresource base and large number of aspiring needy students in its demography.

Commerce
Along with a dispensary and Anaaj Mandi (Grain Market), the village has a stadium. The presence of co-operative society is also there. State Bank of Patiala has got branch in the village. All the things of daily use are available in the local market on regular basis. A milk co-operative dairy serving the people. There are four medical stores.

The cooperative society of Chauke should start cheap rate agriculture, scientific and vocational learning courses for its members, needy students especially socially and financially marginalised ones.

Transportation
It has 3 bus stops to cover each corner of the village and a Petrol Pump has also come up in the village. Village is well connected with all the neighboring villages and to the cities through a proper transport network. Most of the roads are upgraded from 11 feet to 18 feet in 2016-17 by the govt.

Utilities
A newly 66 KV Power station has also started working from the January 2007 which has given this a village an additional advantage. RO system also working here although two big water tanks working.
Village has a big playground[6 acre] along with Anaaj Mandi. There is a well equipped Gymnasium for the health of the youth...

Society
Village has three Gurudwara Sahibs, a Masjid and Temple along with revered Shiv-dwala. Then there are two deras namely Dera Baba Dunna Ji (Punjabi:ਬਾਬਾ ਦੁੱਨਾ ਜੀ) and Dera Baba Bulla Ji (Punjabi:ਬਾਬਾ ਬੂਲਾ ਜੀ). There is a Youth club Shaheed Baba Mahaa Singh Youth Welfare Club in the village along with Patwar-Khana (Place for Patwari). Dashmesh sports club chauke (2016) works for sports activity in the village .

Culture
The villagers celebrate renowned four day mela called Maaghi Da Mela (Punjabi:ਮਾਘੀ ਦਾ ਮੇਲਾ) from 14 January, annually. Distant visitors come to pray at Dera Baba Dunna Ji and Dera Baba Bulla Ji. The four day mela consists of sports activities (Punjabi:ਖੇਡ ਮੇਲਾ) Kabaddi, wrestling, Dog racing, Volleyball, Tug of war, playing card's games & much more.
The villager also celebrate regular Indian functions like New moon, Black moon along with religious festivals of Sikhs, Hindus & Muslims.

Politics 
In the town, there is a bipolar fight between two major political parties named Shiromani Akali Dal and Indian National Congress.Town is dominated by Shiromani Akali Dal as the party is ruling the Town since 1981, losing only in 1989 elections to an independent named Harnek Singh. Currently there are 9 MC's from the ruling Shiromani Akali Dal and 2 from Congress elected in February 2015. Town is headed by S. Balvir Singh (President of Nagar Panchayat).

References

External links

Villages in Bathinda district